The United States Army Special Operations Aviation Command (USASOAC) provides command and control, executive oversight, and resourcing of U.S. Army Special Operations Command (USASOC) aviation assets and units in support of national security objectives. USASOAC is responsible for service and component interface; training, doctrine, and proponency for Army Special Operations Aviation (SOA); system integration and fleet modernization; aviation resource management; material readiness; program management; and ASCC oversight. USASOAC was established March 25, 2011 consisting of 135 headquarters soldiers and subordinate units totaling more than 3,300 personnel, include the 160th Special Operations Aviation Regiment (Airborne), (160th SOAR (A)) which features 4 Aviation Battalions, the USASOC Flight Company, the Special Operations Aviation Training Battalion, the Systems Integration Management Office, and the Technology Application Projects Office. The first commander of USASOAC was Brig Gen. Clayton M.Hutmacher.

Army Special Operations Aviation history
As reported on the USASOC official website:

USASOAC units

160th Special Operations Aviation Regiment (Airborne) (160th SOAR (A))

The 160th SOAR (A) has the mission to organize, equip, train, resource, and employ Army Special Operations Aviation (ARSOA) forces worldwide in support of contingency missions and combatant commanders.  Known as "Night Stalkers," these soldiers are proficient in nighttime operations. They employ modified heavy assault versions of the MH-47 Chinook, medium assault and attack versions of the MH-60 Black Hawk, light assault and attack versions of the MH-6 Little Bird helicopters, and MQ-1C Gray Eagles via four battalions, two extended-range multi-purpose companies, a headquarters company, and a training company that are spread out between Fort Campbell, Hunter Army Airfield, and Joint Base Lewis-McChord.

USASOC Flight Company (UFC)

The UFC was activated in June 2013 by USASOAC and provides responsive fixed and rotary wing training support to USASOC, as well as key planner transport in support of contingency plans. The company was a detachment that began its unique mission in 1996. Its aircraft inventory includes UH-60L Black Hawks, C-212 Aviocars, C-27J Spartans, UV-20 Porters, and C-12C Hurons.

Special Operations Aviation Training Battalion (SOATB)

SOATB conducts basic Army Special Operations Aviation individual training and provides education in order to produce crew members and support personnel with basic and advanced qualifications for the 160th SOAR (A).  The unit averages 235 training days per year including 80 officer graduates, 325 enlisted graduates, and 10,500 flight hours.  Originally called "Green Platoon," ad hoc training functions began in 1983.  In 1988, the unit was officially formed to centralize and standardize recruiting, assessment and training.  In 1990 the mission scope expanded to all active and reserve components. Special Operations Aviation Training Company (SOATC) provisionally designated in 1992, and in 2010 officially re-designated as SOATB.

Technology Applications Program Office (TAPO)
TAPO is responsible for equipping the soldiers of the 160th SOAR(A) with the most capable rotary wing aircraft in the world, facilitating the sustainment of 160th SOAR(A) highly modified and/or unique aircraft, and responsible for life-cycle program management of the ARSOA fleet—involved from concept and refinement through disposal--, facilitate aircraft modernization for the ARSOA fleet, and manage the USASOC rotary wing aviation night vision device and advanced aircraft survivability equipment programs.  TAPO was classified prior to 1997.  After 1997, the unit moved from St Louis, MO (adjacent to Army Aviation and Missile Command) to Joint Base Langley–Eustis, where the Program Office is currently co-located with the Aviation Applied Technology Directorate.

Systems Integration Management Office (SIMO)
SIMO is responsible for equipping the soldiers of the USASOAC Enterprise with the most capable rotary wing aircraft and mission systems in the world and facilitating the sustainment and improvement of USASOAC's highly modified and/or unique aircraft and mission systems.  SIMO processes new requirements, product design, platform integration, development, product fielding, fleet resource planning, product organization, product support, property management, incremental product improvements, and rapid technology injection off the modernization cycle.

List of commanders

 BG Clayton M. Hutmacher, March 25, 2011
 BG Erik C. Peterson, June 10, 2014
 BG John R. Evans Jr., July 2016
 BG Allan M. Pepin, June 22, 2018
 BG Philip J. Ryan, June 26, 2020

See also
 Air Force Special Operations Command
 Helicopter Sea Combat Squadron 85 (HSC-85)

References

United States Army Special Operations Command
Army Z
United States Army Service Component Commands
Aviation Commands of the United States Army